Newtown is a suburb of Johannesburg, South Africa. It is located in the capital city of Gauteng Province and the Region F of the City of Johannesburg Metropolitan Municipality. It has the coordinates of 26.204°S and 28.034°E. The suburb originated as a manufacturing district for brick production and contained a "racially mixed working class".

Historical background
In early 20th century, the Newtown Precinct was named "the Brickfields". By 1896, approximately 7,000 people lived in the town.

Brickfields from Ed Charlton's opinion attracted a number of industries, such as trade firms, banks, brick factories, a brewery, and fisheries, as well as immigrants from other nations.

In April 1904, Mahatma Gandi declared an outbreak of the bubonic plague in Brickfield. The plague caused 82 fatalities and 112 people were reportedly diagnosed with it. The local government initiated the fire brigade to start fires within the town, aiming to cease the plague.

Turbine Hall
Originally built between 1927 and 1934, the Turbine Hall became the largest "three steam-driven" power stations. It is situated in the middle of Newtown and has been deemed an iconic building in the art and culture precinct.

Cleanup
The Greater Newtown Construction, was initiated by City of Johannesburg Municipality Council, which rehabilitated old suburb structures, "enhanced public open spaces," and introduced closed-circuit television.

Newtown's street lighting was designed by the French engineer Patrick Rimoux.

Regeneration
Johannesburg City Council partnered with Gauteng Agency Blue IQ in a project to develop the community of Newtown. The project includes building five housing developments in which Council states "[it will] cater for different levels of income".

The plan details that over 2,000 housing units will be built, within the next few years. The Nelson Mandela Bridge was inaugurated on 20 July 2003, and is the northern entrance to Newtown.

References

Chinatowns in Africa
Chinese-South African culture
Johannesburg Region F
Tourist attractions in Johannesburg
Urban decay in South Africa